Emily Kernan Rafferty was the first woman to serve as president of the Metropolitan Museum of Art, a position she held from 2005 to 2015 as part of a forty-year career at the museum. Currently the museum's president emerita, she also serves on the American Museum of Women's History Congressional Commission, and was a Board Chair of the New York Federal Reserve Bank from 2012 to 2016.

Rafferty was born and raised in New York City and earned a bachelor's degree from Boston University.
Rafferty began working at the Met in 1976 in the development department and as she rose through the ranks, became the first woman to hold a vice president's role at the museum.

References

People associated with the Metropolitan Museum of Art
Boston University alumni

Living people
Year of birth missing (living people)